Kevin Richard Jones (born 16 February 1974) is a Welsh former professional footballer who played as a right-back. He made appearances in the English Football League for Wrexham. He also played in the Welsh League for Bangor City, Holywell Town, Flint Town United and Lex XI.

References

1974 births
Living people
Welsh footballers
Association football defenders
Wrexham A.F.C. players
Bangor City F.C. players
Holywell Town F.C. players
Flint Town United F.C. players
Lex XI F.C. players
English Football League players